Luigi Ganna (1 December 1883 – 2 October 1957) was an Italian professional road racing cyclist. He was the overall winner of the first Giro d'Italia, held in 1909, as well as the first Italian winner of the classic Milan–San Remo earlier that year. Further highlights in his career were his fifth place in the 1908 Tour de France and several podium places in Italian classic races. In 1908 he set a new Italian hour record, which he held for six years.

He was born in Induno Olona, near Varese, in Lombardy. Before becoming a professional cyclist, he worked as a bricklayer, commuting up to 100 km to work by bike.

Major results

1905
3rd Giro di Lombardia
1906
3rd Giro di Lombardia
3rd Giro del Piemonte
1907
2nd Overall Giro della Sicilia
1st 2 Stages
3rd Giro di Lombardia
4th Milan–San Remo
1908
2nd Milan–San Remo
2nd Giro di Lombardia
3rd Roma–Napoli–Roma
5th Tour de France
1909
1st Overall Giro d'Italia
 1st Stages 4, 5 & 7
1st Milan-San Remo
3rd Giro dell'Emilia
6th Giro di Lombardia
1910
1st Giro dell'Emilia
2nd Giro di Lombardia
2nd Italian National Road Race Championships
2nd Roma–Napoli–Roma
3rd Overall Giro d'Italia
1st Stages 5, 7 & 10
1911
3rd Milan–San Remo
1913
3rd Roma–Napoli–Roma
1st Stage 1
5th Giro d'Italia
1914
6th Milan–San Remo

References

Bibliography
 

1883 births
1957 deaths
Italian male cyclists
Giro d'Italia winners
Italian Giro d'Italia stage winners
Cyclists from the Province of Varese